The Cook Islands national handball team is the national handball team of Cook Islands.

Results

Oceania Nations Cup

Pacific Handball Cup

External links
IHF profile

Men's national handball teams